Pioneer Peaks is a national park in Queensland, Australia, 833 km northwest of Brisbane.

See also

 Protected areas of Queensland

References 

National parks of Queensland
Protected areas established in 1992
North Queensland
1992 establishments in Australia